NGC 912 is a compact lenticular galaxy located in the constellation Andromeda about 197 million light years from the Milky Way. It was discovered by French astronomer Édouard Stephan in 1878.

See also 
 List of NGC objects (1–1000)

References

External links 
 

Lenticular galaxies
Andromeda (constellation)
0912
009222